Marcel Witeczek (born 18 October 1968) is a German former professional footballer who played mostly as an attacking midfielder.

Over the course of 15 seasons, he played in 410 Bundesliga games (50 goals; 474/59 counting both major levels of German football), representing four teams, including league powerhouse Bayern Munich, with whom he won his only titles.

Playing career
Born in Tychy, Silesia, Poland, Witeczek moved to Germany aged 13 with his family. He was a successful youth player in his country of adoption, earning runners-up medals at both the 1985 FIFA U-16 World Championship and the 1987 World Youth Championship, winning the Golden Shoe at the latter tournament, with seven goals in as many games. However, he missed the decisive shootout penalty in the final against Yugoslavia, which West Germany lost.

At club level, Witeczek began his career with Bayer Uerdingen, making his first division debut on 8 August 1987, not yet 19, in a 2–0 win at FC Homburg. He moved on to 1. FC Kaiserslautern in 1991 and FC Bayern Munich two years later. With the Bavarians, he enjoyed his most successful period, appearing in 124 official matches over the course of four seasons, winning two league accolades and the 1995–96 UEFA Cup, to whose conquest he contributed with two goals, all against FC Barcelona in the semifinals (one in each leg, in a 4–3 aggregate qualification).

Aged almost 29, Witeczek signed for Borussia Mönchengladbach, suffering relegation in his second season but achieving promotion in his fourth, always as an important first-team member - never appeared in less than 30 league contests in that timeframe; after two slower years, he left for regional league side SG Wattenscheid 09, where he remained two further seasons.

After one year out of football, 37-year old Witeczek joined Landesliga (level 5) club FC Albstadt 07, retiring for good at the season's end.

Honours
Bayern Munich
Bundesliga: 1993–94, 1996–97
UEFA Cup: 1995–96

Germany
FIFA U-17 World Cup: Runner-up 1985
FIFA U-20 World Cup: Runner-up 1987

Individual
FIFA U-17 World Cup: Golden Shoe 1985
FIFA U-20 World Cup: Golden Shoe 1987

References

External links
 
 

1968 births
Living people
People from Tychy
Sportspeople from Silesian Voivodeship
Polish emigrants to West Germany
German footballers
Association football forwards
Association football midfielders
Bundesliga players
2. Bundesliga players
KFC Uerdingen 05 players
1. FC Kaiserslautern players
FC Bayern Munich footballers
Borussia Mönchengladbach players
SG Wattenscheid 09 players
Germany youth international footballers
Germany under-21 international footballers
UEFA Cup winning players
West German footballers
Sportspeople from Oberhausen
Footballers from North Rhine-Westphalia